Aatu Räty (born 14 November 2002) is a Finnish professional ice hockey centre for the Abbotsford Canucks of the American Hockey League (AHL) as a prospect to the Vancouver Canucks of the National Hockey League (NHL). He was selected 52nd overall in the 2021 NHL Entry Draft by the New York Islanders.

Playing career
Räty made his Liiga debut at age 16 and scored his first professional goal in the same game. Räty was considered a top prospect in the 2021 NHL Entry Draft. On 14 August 2021, the New York Islanders announced that they had signed Räty to a three-year, entry-level contract. Räty was assigned to the Bridgeport Islanders of the American Hockey League (AHL) on 19 April 2022, after his team's, Jukurit, 2021–22 Liiga season ended with elimination in the playoffs. 

In the 2022–23 season, Räty was initially re-assigned to continue his tenure in the AHL with Bridgeport before he was recalled on 23 December 2022, and made his NHL debut for the New York Islanders, scoring his first career NHL goal against the Florida Panthers in a 5–1 win.

Following 12 games with the Islanders, posting 2 goals, Räty was traded with Anthony Beauvillier and a conditional first-round pick in 2023 to the Vancouver Canucks on 30 January 2023, as part of a multi-player deal that sent Bo Horvat to the Islanders.

Personal life
Räty's brother, Aku, plays for Kärpät and was drafted in the fifth round of the 2019 NHL Entry Draft by the Arizona Coyotes.

Career statistics

Regular season and playoffs

International

References

External links
 

2002 births
Living people
21st-century Finnish people
Abbotsford Canucks players
Bridgeport Islanders players
Finnish ice hockey centres
Mikkelin Jukurit players
New York Islanders draft picks
New York Islanders players
Oulun Kärpät players
Sportspeople from Oulu
Vancouver Canucks players